Aden Mohamed Nur Saran-Sor, commonly known as Aaden Saransoor, is a Somali warlord. He is a commander in the Rahanweyn Resistance Army (RRA), and his militia is in control of Baidoa, seat of the Transitional Federal Parliament. 

On October 6, 2006, his militia surrounded the house of general Ali Hussein Loyan, (also known as Ali Mohamed Hassan Loyan), the national police commander. On the thirty-first of the same month, Saran-Sor was accused of backing rebellion against the Transitional Federal Parliament by Aden Mohamed Nor, Minister of Justice in the Baidoa-based government. When the RRA split into two rival factions, Saran-Sor supported Mohamed Ibrahim Habsade.

See also
Rahanweyn Resistance Army

References and notes

Somalian politicians
Somalian faction leaders
Living people
Year of birth missing (living people)
Place of birth missing (living people)